The 111th Indian Infantry Brigade was an Infantry formation of the Indian Army during World War II. The brigade was formed in March 1943, in India as a Long Range Penetration Brigade attached to the Chindits   3rd Indian Infantry Division.

Formation
4th Battalion, 9th Gurkha Rifles to March 1945
1st Battalion, Cameronians (Scottish Rifles) to July 1944
3rd Battalion, 4th Gurkha Rifles July 1943 to March 1945
2nd Battalion, Leicestershire Regiment September 1943 to October 1944	
6th Battalion, Nigeria Regiment November 1944 to March 1945

See also

 List of Indian Army Brigades in World War II

References

Brigades of India in World War II
British Indian Army brigades